Dimiter D. Marinov or Dimitar Marinov (born October 6, 1964) is Bulgarian-American actor. In 2019, he became the first Bulgarian to go on the red carpet at the 91st Academy Awards, after he played a supporting role in the film Green Book, which won Best Picture.

Early life
Marinov was born in Sofia, Bulgaria and was adopted by one of Marinovi family, a well-known tobacco company owners, used as a prototype of the Dimitar Dimov's best-selling novel Tobacco. At the age of 11, he became first violin in a youth symphony orchestra and traveled all over Western and Eastern Europe, the US and the Middle East. Following the completion of an associate degree in Classical Music, he discovered his passion for acting.

At the age of 18, Marinov was drafted into the Bulgarian Army which was mandatory during the Communist era. He was assigned to an Artillery Intelligence Unit. Within a year of his service, Dimiter was detained by the People's Military Tribunal. He was accused of conspiring against the People's Republic and trying to escape to the West. The verdict was three years political imprisonment. Regardless of the difficulties that followed after his prison term, Dimiter graduated with a master's degree as an honor student from the Bulgarian National Academy for Theatre and Film in Sofia. In 1990, Dimiter traveled throughout Europe, Canada and the United States as an actor-singer in a Bulgarian folk-jazz stage anthology entitled - Mystery of Bulgarian Voices. Following the last performance in the United States, Dimiter defected as a political refugee in Knoxville, Tennessee.

He took on various jobs including dishwasher, air-brush artist and a handyman. In 1993, Marinov drove across country in his Volkswagen Bug to San Diego, California. The diverse environment helped him to find new venues to grow and establish himself as a "new American". Playing his violin and singing in a vast number of restaurants while working as a coffee barista, he managed in 1996 to become an owner of a coffee shop, restaurant and catering business. Marinov began his US acting career on the stage at The San Diego Repertory Theatre in 1999. In the year 2000, he pursued his passionate dream of working with young children. Partnering with Michael Ari Wulffhart they created, developed and taught numerous children educational programs for the YMCA and the San Diego Zoo.

Career
After completing a three-year business venture with his family in Costa Rica from 2006 to 2009, Marinov returned to the United States in order to expand his acting career in commercials, television and film.

In the Bandito Brothers production Act of Valor, which was his very first US film audition, Marinov made his big screen debut as the diabolical Kerimov, the Russian scientist and smuggler. Marinov's "big break" was in Green Book directed by Peter Farrelly. Marinov co-stars with Viggo Mortensen and Mahershala Ali. The movie received a dozen awards, including the Academy Award for Best Picture and Golden Globe Award for Best Screenplay After the filming of Green Book, Marinov also took on the task of directing Southwest High School's musical production of "Charlie and the Chocolate Factory".

Filmography

Film

Television
S.W.A.T.  - Episode "sea legs" 2019 - George

Personal life
On 31 December 2003 Marinov married his longtime partner. They have two sons, (one born December 30, 2005, and the other May 10, 2013).

References

External links
 

Male actors from Sofia
Living people
Bulgarian emigrants to the United States
1964 births